Mikhail Andreyevich Gluzsky (20 November 1918 – 15 June 2001) was a Soviet and Russian theater and film actor. He starred in the 1972 film, Monologue, which was entered into the 1973 Cannes Film Festival. An actor in more than 130 films between his film debut 1939 and death in 2001, he was named a People's Artist of the USSR in 1983.

Biography
Mikhail Andreyevich Gluzsky was born in Kiev in 1918. He worked at a factory before World War II and made his film debut as a Mosfilm acting studio student, appearing in diverse episodic roles in Grigori Roshal's The Oppenheim Family, Konstantin Yudin's A Girl with a Personality, and Vsevolod Pudovkin's Minin and Pozharsky in 1939. He graduated from the studio in 1940 and joined the troupe of the Central Theater of the Red Army, fought as a soldier in World War II, and worked in Moscow after his discharge. His prolific career in film reached its height during the post-war period.

Gluzsky often appeared in the role of a headstrong leader but also successfully took on the depiction of reflective intellectuals. Awarded the title of honor of People's Artist of the USSR in 1983, he headed the acting workshop of the All-Union State Institute of Cinematography from 1988 to 1996.

One of the most recognizable faces of Soviet and Russian cinema, Mikhail Gluzsky continued to work as an actor even amid the economic crisis of the 1990s, which hit Boris Yeltsin's Russia hard and affected the film industry harshly. He appeared in more than 130 roles between his debut in 1939 and death in 2001. He died in Moscow at the age of eighty-two.

Selected filmography

 The Oppenheim Family (1939)
 A Girl with a Temper (1939)
 Minin and Pozharsky (1939)
 The Village Teacher (1947)
 Mysterious Discovery (1953)
 And Quiet Flows the Don (1958)
 The Alive and the Dead (1964)
 The Big Ore (1964)
 On Thin Ice (1966)
 Kidnapping, Caucasian Style (1966)
 No Path Through Fire (1968)
 I Was Nineteen (1968)
 Liberation (1970)
 Monologue (1972)
 As Ilf and Petrov rode a tram (1972)
 Earth and Sky Adventures (1974)
 Unbelievable Adventures of Italians in Russia (1974)
 An Almost Funny Story (1977)
 Territory (1978)
 TASS Is Authorized to Declare... (1984)
 The Kreutzer Sonata (1987)
 Desyat Negrityat (1987)
 Entrance to the Labyrinth (1989)

Honours and awards
 1973 — Vasilyev Brothers State Prize of the RSFSR for the role of Ivan Stepanovich in the movie Came the Soldiers from the Front (1971)
 1975 — awarded the Dovzhenko silver medal for the film Flame 
 1983 — People's Artist of the USSR
 1998 — Prize of the business community, "Idol" for outstanding contribution to cinema
 Order "For Merit to the Fatherland", 3rd class (16 November 1998) for outstanding contribution to the development of national art
 Order of the Red Banner of Labour (1989)
 Nika Award, twice:
 1997 — for the film The Man for Young Women 
 1999 — in the honour and dignity

References

External links

1918 births
2001 deaths
Actors from Kyiv
Academic staff of the Gerasimov Institute of Cinematography
Honored Artists of the RSFSR
People's Artists of the RSFSR
People's Artists of the USSR
Recipients of the Nika Award
Recipients of the Order "For Merit to the Fatherland", 3rd class
Recipients of the Order of the Red Banner of Labour
Recipients of the Vasilyev Brothers State Prize of the RSFSR
Russian male film actors
Russian male stage actors
Russian male voice actors
Soviet male film actors
Soviet male stage actors
Soviet male voice actors
Soviet military personnel of World War II
Spoken word artists
Burials at Vagankovo Cemetery